HD 23753 is a single star in the equatorial zodiac constellation of Taurus, and is a member of the Pleiades open cluster. It is dimly visible to the naked eye with an apparent visual magnitude of 5.44. It is moving further from the Earth with a heliocentric radial velocity  of +8 km/s. The star is positioned near the ecliptic and so is subject to lunar occultations.

This is a B-type main-sequence star with a stellar classification of B9 Vn, where the 'n' indicates "nebulous" lines due to rapid rotation. It is 125 million years old with a projected rotational velocity of 335 km/s, completing a full revolution about its axis every . HD 23753 has been catalogued as a suspected variable star with the designation NSV 1321, although the amplitude is no more than 0.1 magnitude and it may even be suitable for a photometric standard. Wraight et al. report that STEREO detected very shallow eclipses, with a period of 2.2663 days, during which the brightness falls by 1%.

HD 23753 has 3.21 times the mass of the Sun and 3.2 times the Sun's radius. It is radiating 150 times the Sun's luminosity from its photosphere at an effective temperature of 11,535 K.

See also
 Pleiades

References

B-type main-sequence stars
Suspected variables
Pleiades Open Cluster
Taurus (constellation)
Durchmusterung objects
023753
017776
1172